This is a list of U.S. county name etymologies, covering the letters A to D.

A

B

C

D

See also
Lists of U.S. county name etymologies for links to the remainder of the list.

References